The Associação Desportiva RJX and thereafter RJ Vôlei was a Brazilian volleyball team based in Rio de Janeiro, Rio de Janeiro state. They compete in the Brazilian Superliga and were the 2012–13 national league champions.

History 
The team was founded in 2011 with sponsorship and support of EBX Group controlled by business magnate Eike Batista in partnership with the Government of the State of Rio de Janeiro, marking the return of a men's volleyball team in the Rio city. In 2013 following the loss of the main sponsor, the club changed its name to RJ Vôlei. After finishing fifth in the 2013–14 Brazilian Superliga the team withdrew from the following season due to financial troubles.

Current squad 
Squad as of October 21, 2012

Head coach:  Marcelo Fronckowiak
Assistant coach:  Leonardo de Carvalho

Honors 
Brazilian Superliga
Winners (1): 2012–13

Campeonato Carioca
Winners (2): 2011, 2012

References

External links
EBX Group Official website

Brazilian volleyball clubs
Sports teams in Rio de Janeiro (city)
Volleyball clubs established in 2011
Volleyball clubs disestablished in 2014
2011 establishments in Brazil
2014 disestablishments in Brazil